Ritomeče is a small settlement above Gradišče in the Municipality of Hrpelje-Kozina in the Littoral region of Slovenia.

References

External links

Ritomeče on Geopedia

Populated places in the Municipality of Hrpelje-Kozina